Piea is a comune (municipality) in the Province of Asti in the Italian region Piedmont, located about  east of Turin and about  northwest of Asti.

References

External links
 Official website

Cities and towns in Piedmont